"The Weaver in the Vault" is a short story by American author Clark Ashton Smith as part of his Zothique cycle, and first published in the January 1934 issue of Weird Tales.

Plot
The king of Tasuun, Famorgh, sends three henchmen (Yanur, Grotara, Thirlain Ludoch) from Miraab to Chaon Gacca to deliver the remains of King Tnepreez. As they journey from the city in a caravan of camels, they note in the past a similar task. Yanur notes two centuries ago King Mandis asked two of his men for the golden mirror of Queen Avaina as a gift for his favourite leman.  However, those two never returned and the king offered a different gift instead. The three remark that Chaon Gacca is occupied by shadows from the desert Dloth. Thirlain Ludoch points out that the shadows would appear in palaces and when touches would render the skin withered. King Ameni suffered an injury to his hand due to this. Yanur remarks Chaon Gacca was also besieged by earthquakes. The three find the task before them arduous as Famorgh was requested by his queen Lunalia, a princess of the desert Xylac; when other mummies would do. One night they camp in the shrine of Yuckla, the god of laughter. Later, as they approach the tomb, they drink a vintage which renders them unafraid amid the gloom. In the tombs, they find that the mummies are missing while they are also wrecked by earthquakes. One kills Yanur and Thirlain Ludoch while living is Grotara. Despite being alive, Grotara is not well as he finds an orb floating from the chasms and draws power from the dead. It waits for Grotara to die as it weaves a web before death befalls him.

Reception
In the 1981 book Twentieth-Century Science-Fiction Writers, Will Murray noted the story as "the weird doom of two individuals who desecrate the tomb."

See also 
Clark Ashton Smith bibliography

References

External links

Text of "The Weaver in the Vault"

Short stories by Clark Ashton Smith
Fantasy short stories
1934 short stories
Works originally published in Weird Tales